Pandanus tonkinensis is a plant species endemic to Vietnam.

Pandanus tonkinensis is one of the smaller members of the genus. It has leaves up to 90 cm long. Inflorescence is terminal.

References

tonkinensis
Endemic flora of Vietnam
Plants described in 1983